The 2016 United States House of Representatives elections in Virginia was held on Election Day, November 8, 2016, to elect the 11 U.S. representatives from the state of Virginia, one from each of the state's 11 congressional districts. The elections coincided with the 2016 U.S. presidential election, as well as House of Representatives elections, Senate elections and various state and local elections. The primaries were held on June 14.

Statewide results

2016 Virginia redistricting
 
On October 2013 three voters in the third congressional district filed a lawsuit against Virginia Governor Bob McDonnell’s 2012 congressional map. The three voters argued the new map was unconstitutional on the grounds that it packed black voters in the third district. On October 7th, 2014 a three-justice District Court ruled the map unconstitutional and against the 14th amendment. However, they ruled the maps to continue use in the 2014 House Elections and for the General Assembly to redraw the maps by April 1st, 2015.
Following this decision 10 current and former Republican House members appealed to the Supreme Court to overturn the lower court's decision. However, the Supreme Court had just ruled in a major racial gerrymandering case in Alabama Legislative Black Caucus v Alabama, so it argued for the case to be re-visited by the District Court with the new ruling in mind. Then on June 5th, 2015 the District Court again ruled the map unconstitutional and that the General Assembly must redraw the map by September 1st, 2015. Again all Republican House members choose to appeal to the Supreme Court.

However, during the appeal process, the deadline of September 1st passed without the General Assembly approving a map, so the district court appointed a special master to redraw the map. Following this on January 7th, 2016 the special master’s map got approved by the District Court. The Republican House members then asked the Supreme Court to pause the implantation of the District Court’s map to finish the original appeal about jurisdiction. The Supreme Court then unanimously denied this request allowing the new map to be used in the 2016 House primaries and election, then on March 21st, 2016 the Supreme Court heard oral arguments on the appeal. The Supreme Court would then rule that the appeal had no standing and dismissed the Republican House members' appeal citing Article III of the Constitution. 

The Republican House members then sued the District Court’s map for striking down the original map. Only three of the 10 Republican members chose to appear in front of the Supreme Court. Randy Forbes, one of the three in front of the court, made the argument that the new map would force him off the 4th District as it would go from Republican-leaning to Democratic-leaning. This was the main talking point of the three Republican House members as during the court case they continued to argue that the new map would threaten the incumbent's re-elections. However, the Supreme Court would argue in favor of the District Court, ruling that the new map would stand.

District 1

Republican Rob Wittman had represented Virginia's 1st congressional district since 2007.  He was re-elected in 2014 with 63% of the vote.

Wittman announced that he intended to run for governor in 2017, but would still run for re-election in 2016.

Republican primary

Candidates

Nominee
Rob Wittman, incumbent U.S. Representative

Democratic convention
A convention was scheduled for May 21 to select a nominee, with a filing deadline of May 7. Bowling Green Town Councilman Matt Rowe was the only candidate to file before the deadline, and was thus automatically nominated.

Candidates

Nominee
Matt Rowe, Bowling Green Town Councilman

Independent candidate Gail Parker also ran.

General election

Results

District 2

Republican Scott Rigell was the incumbent of the 2nd district, which had a PVI of R+2. Rigell was first elected in 2010. Rigell declined to seek re-election. The district encompassed Virginia Beach and surrounding areas.

Republican primary

Candidates

Nominee
 Scott Taylor, state delegate, candidate for this seat in 2010 and candidate for Mayor of Virginia Beach in 2008

Eliminated in primary
 Pat Cardwell, attorney
 Randy Forbes, incumbent U.S. Representative for Virginia's 4th congressional district

Declined
 Glenn Davis, state delegate
 Bill DeSteph, state senator
 Ben Loyola, defense contractor, candidate for the seat in 2010 and nominee for state senate in 2011
 Jeff McWaters, former state senator and founder and former CEO of Amerigroup
 Jason Miyares, state delegate
 Bert Mizusawa, Army Reserve major general and candidate for the seat in 2010
 Chris Stolle, state delegate
 Frank Wagner, state senator

Endorsements

Results

Democratic primary
Scott Rigell's retirement was expected to make the race competitive, with the Rothenberg & Gonzales Political Report immediately changing the rating from Safe to Lean Republican.  However, due to the perceived strength of Congressman Forbes's entry into the race, Shaun Brown, a community activist in Hampton, VA who had originally planned to primary US Representative Bobby Scott (D) for the 3rd district, ended up being the only candidate to file for the primary, making her automatically the nominee.

Candidates

Nominee
 Shaun Brown, community activist

Declined
 Dave Belote, chair of the Virginia Beach Democratic Committee, retired air force colonel, former Nellis Air Force Base installation commander and 2015 state senate candidate
 Paul Hirschbiel, nominee in 2012
 Lynwood Lewis, state senator
 Andria McClellan, businesswoman, state senate candidate in 2013 and Norfolk City councilwoman 
 Jody Wagner, former state treasurer, former State Secretary of Finance, nominee in 2000 and nominee for lieutenant governor in 2009

General election

Endorsements

Results

District 3

Democrat Bobby Scott had represented Virginia's 3rd congressional district since 1993.  He was re-elected in 2014 with 94% of the vote, but the district was made slightly more competitive following the court-ordered redistricting when all of its Richmond and Petersburg constituents were moved into the 4th district.

Democratic primary

Candidates

Nominee
Bobby Scott, incumbent U.S. Representative

Republican primary

Candidates

Nominee
Marty Williams, former president of the Virginia State Faternal Order of Police and chairman of the Chesapeake Planning Commission

General election

Endorsements

Results

District 4

Republican Randy Forbes, first elected in 2001, was the incumbent of the 4th district, but attempted to seek re-election in the 2nd district. The 4th district was changed from a Hampton Roads centered district to a Richmond-centered district following the court's redistricting. Notably, it gained heavily Democratic, black-majority Richmond and Petersburg, which was enough to turn the district into a strongly Democratic district on paper. The old 4th had a PVI of R+4, while the new 4th had a PVI of D+10. The district was considered a Safe Gain for the Democrats by many political analysts, including Larry Sabato's Crystal Ball.

Republican primary

Candidates

Nominee
 Mike Wade, Henrico County Sheriff

Eliminated in primary
 Jackee Gonzalez

Declined
 Randy Forbes, incumbent U.S. Representative (running for VA-02)
 Suzy Kelly, Chesapeake City Councilwoman

Results

Democratic primary

Candidates

Nominee
 Donald McEachin, state senator and nominee for attorney general in 2001

Eliminated in primary
 Ella Ward, Chesapeake city councilwoman and nominee in 2012

Declined
 Lamont Bagby, state delegate
 Elliott Fausz, nominee in 2014
 Jennifer McClellan, state delegate
 Levar Stoney, Secretary of the Commonwealth of Virginia

Results

General election

Endorsements

Predictions

Results

District 5

Incumbent Republican Robert Hurt, first elected in 2010, is retiring in 2016. The 5th district, which has a PVI of R+5, is the largest district in the state and stretches from Virginia's southern border to the suburbs of Washington, D.C.

Republican convention
The Republican party selected State Senator Tom Garrett as its nominee at a convention on May 14, with a filing deadline of March 31.

Candidates

Nominee
 Tom Garrett, state senator

Eliminated in primary
 Michael Del Rosso, technology executive
 Jim McKelvey, real estate developer, candidate in 2010 and state delegate candidate in 2013
 Joe Whited, congressional intelligence advisor

Withdrawn
 Andrew Griffin, former congressional staffer

Democratic convention
The Democratic party had scheduled a convention on May 7 to select a nominee.  Jane Dittmar, the former chair of the Albemarle County Board of Supervisors, was the only candidate to file by the filing deadline and so has been declared the Democratic nominee.

Candidates

Nominee
 Jane Dittmar, former chair of the Albemarle County Board of Supervisors

Withdrawn
 Ericke Cage, former congressional aide

Declined
 Ward Armstrong, former House Minority Leader
 Todd Haymore, Secretary of Agriculture and Forestry and former congressional aide

General election

Endorsements

Predictions

Results

District 6

Republican Bob Goodlatte has represented Virginia's 6th congressional district since 1993.  He was re-elected with 75% of the vote in 2014.

Republican primary
Harry Griego, a pilot and air force veteran who made a 2015 primary challenge of State Delegate Chris Head, challenged Goodlatte for the Republican nomination.

Candidates

Nominee
Bob Goodlatte, incumbent U.S. Representative

Eliminated in primary
Harry Griego, pilot and air force veteran

Primary results

Democratic primary
In 2014, Democratic candidate Bruce Elder, a Staunton City Councilman, had to end his campaign after being diagnosed with cancer. Democrats did not field any candidates to challenge Goodlatte for that year's election.

No Democratic candidates announced in the early part of 2016, but Chris Hurst, a reporter for WDBJ in Roanoke who was the boyfriend of murdered reporter Alison Parker, had reportedly met with the Democratic Congressional Campaign Committee to discuss a potential campaign for this district.  By late May, the only declared Democratic candidate was Warren County Democratic Party Chair Tom Howarth.  However, citing health issues, Mr. Howarth withdrew. Kai Degner, a member of the Harrisonburg City Council and former mayor of the city, became the nominee by acclamation in early June.

Candidates

Nominee
Kai Degner, former Mayor of Harrisonburg

Withdrawn
Tom Howarth, Warren County Democratic Party Chair

Declined
Chris Hurst, reporter for WDBJ

General election

Results

District 7

Republican Dave Brat has represented Virginia's 7th congressional district since 2014.  He was elected in 2014 with 61% of the vote.

Republican primary

Candidates

Nominee
Dave Brat, incumbent U.S. Representative

Withdrawn
 Mike Wade, Henrico County Sheriff

Democratic primary

Candidates

Nominee
Eileen Bedell, small business owner and attorney

General election

Endorsements

Results

District 8

Democrat Don Beyer has represented Virginia's 8th congressional district since 2015. He was elected in 2014 with 63% of the vote.

Republican convention
The Republican party selected a nominee at a convention on May 7.

Two candidates sought the Republican nomination: Charles Hernick, an environmental consultant, and Mike Webb, a retired army officer. Hernick defeated Webb to become the nominee.

Candidates

Nominee
Charles Hernick, environmental consultant

Eliminated at the convention
Mike Webb, retired army officer

Other Candidates
Independent candidate Julio Gracia also ran.

General election

Endorsements

Results

District 9

Republican Morgan Griffith represented Virginia's 9th congressional district since 2011. He won re-election to a third term in 2014 with 72% of the vote.

Republican primary

Candidates

Nominee
Morgan Griffith, incumbent U.S. Representative

Democratic convention
The Democratic party selected retired army veteran Derek Kitts as the nominee in a May 21 convention.

Candidates

Nominee
Derek Kitts, retired army veteran

Eliminated at the convention
Bill Bunch, farmer and retired postal worker

Declined
David Bowers, Mayor of Roanoke

Other Candidates
Independent candidate Janice Boyd also ran.

General election

Results

District 10

Republican Barbara Comstock is the incumbent in the 10th district. In 2015, Comstock succeeded Republican Frank Wolf, who served for 17 terms before choosing to not seek re-election 2014. The 10th district, which has a PVI of D+1, consists of the northernmost portions of the state. Comstock ran for re-election.

Republican primary

Candidates

Nominee
Barbara Comstock, incumbent U.S. Representative

Democratic primary

Candidates

Nominee
LuAnn Bennett, real estate executive and ex-wife of former 8th District Congressman Jim Moran

Other Candidates
Libertarian candidate JD Thorpe ran as a write-in candidate.

General election

Campaign
Due to the competitiveness of the district and the ability of both candidates to raise large amounts of money, the race was expected to be one of the most heavily contested in the country. Democratic strategist Ellen Qualls said the 10th District is "essentially the swingiest district in the swingiest state." 

In the first three weeks of her campaign, Bennett raised $281,000, while Comstock raised $2 million overall since January 2015.

Endorsements

Predictions

Results

Comstock was re-elected even though her district voted for Clinton by 10 percentage points in the presidential race.

District 11

Democrat Gerry Connolly has represented Virginia's 11th congressional district since 2009. He was re-elected in 2014 with 57% of the vote. He was the only candidate on the ballot for the seat in 2016.

Democratic primary

Candidates

Nominee
Gerry Connolly, incumbent U.S. Representative

Republican convention
One person, John Wolfe, filed for the Republican nomination, which was to be decided at a convention on May 14, 2016. However, Wolfe did not campaign or even attend the convention, so the convention delegates rejected his nomination by a 3-to-1 margin. The 11th District Republican Committee searched for a new candidate, but ultimately decided no viable candidate was available and opted to focus on the presidential race and on defeating the Fairfax County meals tax referendum.

Libertarian nomination
One person, Daniel Mittereder, filed for the Libertarian nomination and was accepted.  However, he suffered a severe strep throat infection shortly afterward which required a tonsillectomy and was forced to withdraw his candidacy.

General election

Endorsements

Results

References

External links
U.S. House elections in Virginia, 2016 at Ballotpedia
Campaign contributions at OpenSecrets

House
Virginia
2016